Rejang or Rejangese may refer to:
 Rejang people, an ethnic group of Sumatra, Indonesia
 Rejang language, a language of Sumatra, Indonesia
 Rejang Lebong Regency, a regency in Bengkulu Province, Sumatra, Indonesia
 Rejang script, a writing system formerly used in Sumatra, Indonesia
 Rejang (Unicode block) characters used in the Rejang script
 Rejang dance, a sacred Balinese dance
 Rejang Kayan language, spoken on the island of Borneo in Malaysia and Indonesia
 Rejang–Sajau languages, a group of mutually intelligible isolects spoken by the Punan Bah

See also
 Rajang (disambiguation)